The 2012–13 Israeli Hockey League season was the 22nd season of the Israeli Hockey League, the top level of ice hockey in Israel. Seven teams participated in the league, and the Rishon Devils won the championship.

First round

Final round

3rd place 

Maccabi Metulla - Horses 
- : +

Final 

Monfort - Rishon Devils
1:4 (0:1, 0:2, 1:1)

References

Isr
Israeli League (ice hockey) seasons
Seasons